Agni Pariksha (alternatively Agni Pareeksha or Agni Pariksha or Agnipariksha) is a 1954 Indian Bengali-language romantic drama film directed by Agradoot and starring Uttam Kumar and Suchita Sen. The film was adapted from Asha Purna Devi's novel of the same name. The film become overwhelming success from both critically and commercially. The movie was remade in Hindi in 1967 as Chhoti Si Mulaqat also starring Uttam Kumar. Before that the movie was simultaneously made into a 1959 Telugu - Tamil bilingual titled Mangalya Balam in Telugu and Manjal Mahimai in Tamil.

Plot 
The story revolves around Tapasi, a singer who has been married forcefully as a child to an old village zamindar's grandson Bulu. Back at home, her parents discovers the truth and vows to wipe out every single memory of Tapasi ever being married. Years later, Tapasi has now grown up to be a lovely young lady and is in love with Kiriti. She introduces Kiriti to her mother, who approves of him, and plans to marry them. Things change when Tapasi finds out that she has already been married in her childhood. This creates a conflict in her. As others find out this secret and ostracize Tapasi. How will Tapasi and Kiriti deal with this stigma? Will they triumph in their love?

Cast
 Uttam Kumar as Kiriti Mukherjee 
 Suchitra Sen as Tapasi Banerjee
 Anup Kumar
 Jahar Ganguly
 Jahor Roy
 Kamal Mitra
 Panchanan Bhattacharya
 Bibhu Bhattacharya
 Shikharani Bag
 Shyamali Chakraborty
 Suprabha Mukhopadhyay
 Aparna Debi
 Jamuna Singha
 Sabita Bhattacharya

Soundtrack

Reception
The film became a trend setter for Bengali cinema. The film created a record at the box office and became an all time blockbuster and ran for 126 days in theatres. It collected over five times its budget. It became the highest grossing Bengali film of 1954.

Controversy
To see the poster of Agnipariksha Uttam's wife Gauri Devi and Suchitra's husband Divanath both thoughts there have been a real love affairs between Uttam and Suchitra. In the poster there is written Agnipariksha : Amader Pronoyer Sakshi to see this Dibanath and Gauri become so angry on Uttam and Suchitra so there had been huge problems between all of them.

Remakes
The film was remade in Telugu and Tamil in 1959 as Mangalya Balam and Manjal Mahimai respectively, starring Savitri and the famous Telugu star ANR. That film was one National Film Award in 7th National Film Award. The film was remade in Hindi as Chhoti Si Mulaqat with Uttam Kumar producing and reprising his role and Vyjaianthimala in Suchitra Sen role.

Notes

References

External links
 

1954 films
Bengali-language Indian films
Films based on Indian novels
Bengali films remade in other languages
1950s Bengali-language films
Films directed by Agradoot
Indian romantic drama films
1954 romantic drama films
Indian black-and-white films
Films based on works by Ashapurna Devi